Battle of Málaga or Siege of Málaga may refer to:
Siege of Málaga (1487), a siege by Castile and Aragon during the Granada War
Battle of Málaga (1704), a naval battle in the War of the Spanish Succession
Battle of Málaga (1937), a battle in the Spanish Civil War

es:Sitio de Málaga